The Roman Catholic Diocese of Nanlong/Anlong is a diocese located in Anlong (Guizhou) in the Ecclesiastical province of Guiyang in China.

History

 February 16, 1922: Established as Apostolic Prefecture of Nanlong 南龍/Anlong/Hin-y-fou 安龍/興義府  from the Apostolic Vicariate of Kweichow 貴州 and Apostolic Vicariate of Guangxi 廣西
 April 27, 1927: Promoted as Apostolic Vicariate of Nanlong 南龍/Anlong 安龍
 April 11, 1946: Promoted as Diocese of Nanlong 南龍/Anlong 安龍

Leadership
 Bishops of Nanlong 南龍 (Roman rite)
 Bishop Alexandre-François-Marie Carlo, M.E.P. (April 11, 1946 – January 26, 1952)
 Vicars Apostolic of Nanlong 南龍 (Roman Rite)
 Bishop Alexandre-François-Marie Carlo, M.E.P. (April 21, 1927 – April 11, 1946)
 Prefects Apostolic of Nanlong 南龍 (Roman Rite)
 Fr. Alexandre-François-Marie Carlo, M.E.P. (later Bishop) (November 22, 1922 – April 21, 1927)

References

 GCatholic.org
 Catholic Hierarchy

Roman Catholic dioceses in China
Christian organizations established in 1922
Roman Catholic dioceses and prelatures established in the 20th century
Christianity in Guizhou
Organizations based in Guizhou
1922 establishments in China